is a Japanese manga artist from Tokyo and the creator of the manga series Shirley, Emma, and A Bride's Story. Many of her works are centered on female characters in the 19th century, such as a maid in Victorian Britain and a bride in Turkic Central Asia. She also wrote dōjinshi (self-published manga) under the pen name  as a member of the dōjin circle Lady Maid.

Mori's works are known for their high level of detail in terms of clothing design, historical nuances, and background work. Her manga series are often published outside Japan in larger, hardbound editions to complement the heavy detail seen on every page. Similar to authors such as Hiromu Arakawa, Mori often depicts herself in unflattering self-portraits with a simple outline for a body and a head full of wild hair, as she is very reluctant to show her face during public events or interviews.

In 2010, Mori's first published work, Shirley, was revived in a two-part continuation called Shirley Madison in Fellows! (now Harta) magazine. Her latest work, A Bride's Story, began serialization in the same magazine in 2008 and transferred to  magazine in 2021.

Mori visited Finland in 2014, participating in the Animecon event held in Kuopio.

Works 
  – Release date: February 2003, relaunched in 2010. .
  – Serialized in Enterbrain's Comic Beam magazine from 2002 to 2008. Published in 10 volumes.
  – First serialized in Enterbrain's Harta magazine from October 2008 to November 2020. Transferred to Kadokawa's  magazine in June 2021.

Contributions 
  – Art; story by Satoshi Fukushima.

Awards 
 Excellence Prize – 2005 Japan Media Arts Festival, for Emma
  ("Intergenerational Award") – 2012 Angoulême International Comics Festival, for A Bride's Story
 7th Annual Manga Taishō Award – 2014 Manga Taishō, for A Bride's Story

References

External links 
 
 Interview with Kaoru Mori at Anime News Network
 Interview with Kaoru Mori at Comic Natalie 
  

1978 births
Manga artists from Tokyo
Manga Taishō
Living people
People from Tokyo
Women manga artists